Snowstorm (Mećava) is a 1977 Croatian film directed by Antun Vrdoljak.

References

External links
 

1977 films
1970s Croatian-language films
Croatian films based on plays
Croatian drama films
Films based on works by Croatian writers
1977 drama films
Yugoslav drama films
Jadran Film films